Gateway to Ravens Bluff, The Living City is an adventure module published in 1989 for the Advanced Dungeons & Dragons fantasy role-playing game.

Contents
Gateway to Ravens Bluff is a campaign setting supplement which details the town of Ravens Bluff, including descriptions of numerous locations and characters within the town.

Publication history
LC1 Gateway to Ravens Bluff was compiled by Jean Rabe and edited by Skip Williams and Ed Sollers, with a cover by Keith Parkinson, and was published by TSR in 1989 as a 64-page booklet with a large color map and an outer folder.

Members of the RPGA designed all shops and personalities in this book. Gateway to Ravens Bluff was made available only by mail to members of the RPGA until 1990.

Reception

References

Dungeons & Dragons modules
Role-playing game supplements introduced in 1989